Edward or Ted Hughes may refer to:

Politicians
 Edward Hughes (trade unionist) (1856–1925), Welsh trade unionist
 Edward J. Hughes (1888–1944), American politician
 Edward Hughes (MP) (died 1734), British politician
 Edward Burton Hughes (1905–1987), New York State official
 Edward J. Hughes Jr., American politician in the New Jersey Senate
 Eddie Hughes (Australian politician), South Australian politician

Sportspeople
 Eddie Hughes (basketball) (born 1960), American basketball player
 Ned Hughes (1881–1928), New Zealand rugby player
 Ted Hughes (footballer) (1876–?), Everton, Tottenham Hotspur and Wales international footballer

Others
 Edward Hughes (artist) (1832–1908), English painter
 Edward Hughes (bishop) (1920–2012), American bishop
 Edward Hughes (exorcist) (1918–1980), Catholic priest
 Edward Hughes (poet) (1772–1850), Welsh poet and clergyman
 Sir Edward Hughes (Royal Navy officer) (c. 1720–1794)
 Sir Edward Hughes (1784 EIC ship)
 Edward Hughes (sailor) (fl. 1824–1825), English ship's master for whom Hughes Bay, Antarctica, is named
 Edward David Hughes (1906–1963), British chemist
 Edward Ellis Hughes, American painter
 Edward Ernest Hughes (1877–1953), first professor of history at University College, Swansea
 Edward Hughes Ball Hughes (1798–1863), inheritor of Admiral Edward Hughes' fortune and English dandy of Regency period
 Edward Merritt Hughes (1850–1903), officer in the United States Navy during the Spanish–American War
 Edward Robert Hughes (1851–1914), English painter 
 Sir Edward Hughes (surgeon) (1919–1998), Melbourne colorectal surgeon
 Ted Hughes (1930–1998), English poet and children's writer
 Ted Hughes (judge) (1927–2020), Canadian judge

See also
 Eddie Hughes (disambiguation)
 Ed Hughes (disambiguation)
 Ted Hughes (disambiguation)
 Hughes (surname)